The Central Stags, formerly known as Central Districts, are a first-class cricket team based in central New Zealand. They are the men's representative side of the Central Districts Cricket Association. They compete in the Plunket Shield first-class competition, The Ford Trophy domestic one-day competition and the Men's Super Smash Twenty20 competition. They are one of six teams that make up New Zealand Cricket. They were the fifth of the current teams to compete in the Plunket Shield, which they entered for the first time in the 1950/51 season.

History
Central Districts comprises eight District associations: Hawke's Bay, Horowhenua-Kapiti, Manawatu, Taranaki, Wairarapa and Wanganui in the North Island, and Marlborough and Nelson in the South Island. Previously, many players from these regions competed for Wellington. More than a century before the eventual founding of the Central Districts Cricket Association, the first fully recorded cricket match in New Zealand was played in what is now one of its districts, in Nelson, a men's match in March 1844.

Between October 2016 and February 2019, the team set a new Central Districts record for the number of consecutive first-class matches without a defeat, with 21. The previous Central Stags record in the Plunket Shield was 12, while the New Zealand record for most consecutive domestic first-class matches without a loss is 24, set by Wellington (now known as the Wellington Firebirds) between 1984/85 and 1986/87.

Retired top order batsman Peter Ingram holds the record for the highest individual first-class score for the Central Stags with an innings of 247 in 2008/09, and also scored their second highest individual score with 245 not out in 2009/10.

The New Zealand T20 all wickets partnership record is also held by Peter Ingram, having put on 201 for the first wicket with Jamie How at Pukekura Park in 2011/12 against Wellington.

How and Jeet Raval share the New Zealand Domestic List A partnership record of 321, set against Northern Districts at Seddon Park in 2012/13, a match in which How became the first player to score a Ford Trophy double century, reaching his hundred in 49 balls and breaking the record that was held by retired Canterbury batsman Peter Fulton.

The Central Stags is the home side of one of New Zealand's greatest batsmen, Ross Taylor, who made his first-class debut for the team as an 18-year-old on 9 January 2003. In 2021/22 at Pukekura Park, Taylor broke the record for the fastest Ford Trophy century, reaching his hundred in 49 balls, breaking the national record that had been held by retired Canterbury batsman Peter Fulton.

In 2017, Brad Schmulian hit the highest score by any New Zealand cricketer on first-class debut with an innings of 203 for the Central Stags against Northern Districts at Bay Oval. The previous record had stood since the late 19th century.

In 2010, Kieran Noema-Barnett set a New Zealand record for the fastest T20 half century, off just 18 balls. In the 2016 Ford Trophy Grand Final, another Central Stags batsman, Tom Bruce, added the record for the fastest one-day half century in New Zealand with his 50 coming off 16 balls.

Two batsmen named Ben Smith have played for the Central Stags. Adding to the confusion, both Ben Smith and Ben Smith have scored a first-class double century for the team.

Two of New Zealand's premier cricketing schools, New Plymouth Boys' High School and Palmerston North Boys' High, have produced a number of Stags players, along with schools such as Napier Boys' High School, Nelson College and Whanganui Collegiate.

The CEO of Central Districts Cricket Association is a former Central Stags player, Lance Hamilton. In September 2019 former CEO Pete de Wet announced that CDCA had signed renowned international coach Mickey Arthur as the Central Stags T20 coach for the 2019/20 Super Smash season, however Arthur was granted a contract release before the competition began.

In 2019/20, the team had a chance to become the first team since 1940 to win the Plunket Shield for three seasons in a row. However, the team was second on the table when the final two rounds of the eight-match season were cancelled due to the COVID-19 pandemic. The Plunket Shield was awarded to the Wellington cricket team, whom they had been about to play at McLean Park, with the Stags declared runners-up.

Honours

 Plunket Shield (11)
1953–54, 1966–67, 1967–68, 1970–71, 1986–87, 1991–92, 1998–99, 2005–06, 2012–13, 2017–18, 2018–19

 The Ford Trophy (6)
1984–85, 2000–01, 2003–04, 2011–12, 2014–15, 2015–16

 Men's Super Smash (3)
2007–08, 2009–10, 2018–19

Grounds

Current
McLean Park, Napier
Saxton Oval, Nelson
Pukekura Park, New Plymouth
Fitzherbert Park, Palmerston North

Since 2014–15, Central Districts have used McLean Park, Nelson Park, Napier and Saxton Oval for first-class matches. Pukekura Park and Fitzherbert Park, as well as McLean Park and Saxton Oval, are still used regularly for List A matches. Pukekura Park and McLean Park are used for T20 matches.

Former

Horton Park, Blenheim
Dannevirke Domain, Dannevirke
Cornwall Park, Hastings
Levin Domain, Levin 
Queen Elizabeth Park, Masterton
Memorial Park, Motueka
Trafalgar Park, Nelson
Yarrow Stadium, New Plymouth 
Waikanae Park, Waikanae
Cooks Gardens, Whanganui
Victoria Park, Whanganui

Current squad

 No. denotes the player's squad number, as worn on the back of their shirt.
  denotes players with international caps.

Notable players

New Zealand
 Craig Ingham
 Don Beard
 Harry Cave
 Bevan Congdon
 Vic Pollard
 Bryan Yuile
 Ian Leggat
 Jock Edwards
 Mike Shrimpton
 Scott Briasco
 Lance Cairns
 David O'Sullivan
 Ian Smith
 Martin Crowe
 Andrew Jones
 Mark Greatbatch
 Gary Robertson
 Glen Sulzberger
 Greg Loveridge
 Craig Findlay
 Andrew Penn
 Carl Bulfin
 Ewen Thompson
 Mark Douglas
 Roger Twose
 Tony Blain
 Craig Spearman
 Derek Stirling
 Brendon Diamanti
 Jamie How
 Peter Ingram
 Michael Mason
 Ross Taylor
 Jacob Oram
 Mathew Sinclair
 Lance Hamilton
 Jesse Ryder
 Doug Bracewell
 Kieran Noema-Barnett
 Tarun Nethula
 Jeet Raval
 Mitchell McClenaghan
 Adam Milne
 Andrew Mathieson
 Ben Wheeler
 Will Young
 George Worker
 Tom Bruce
 Ajaz Patel
 Seth Rance
 Blair Tickner
 Brad Schmulian
 Willem Ludick

England
 Ben Smith 
 Peter Trego
 Graham Napier

Sri Lanka
 Mahela Jayawardena

India
 Murali Vijay
 Amit Mishra

Records
See List of New Zealand first-class cricket records

References

External links
 

New Zealand first-class cricket teams
Cricket clubs established in 1950
1950 establishments in New Zealand

Cricket in Central Districts
Super Smash (cricket)